The Type 89 self-propelled howitzer (military designation PLZ-89) is a 122 mm self-propelled howitzer used by the People's Liberation Army of China to replace Type 85 and Type 70 122 mm self-propelled howitzer. PLZ-89 was first unveiled to the public during 1999 National Day military parade.

Development
Since the late 1970s, a number of 122 mm self-propelled howitzers (SPH) were developed in China to meet Chinese Army requirements. The PLA required mobile artillery system to provide medium- to long-range indirect fire support for motorized infantry and armored troops and capable of keeping pace with them. However none of them could meet these requirements. The Type 89, also known as the PLZ89, self-propelled howitzer was developed in late 1980s. It was Chinese attempt to develop indigenous SPH with similar capabilities to the Soviet 2S1 Gvozdika. The Type 89 is currently in service with Chinese Army and Marines. Several hundred of these artillery systems were built.

Design
The Type 89 SPH is armed with a 122 mm/L32 howitzer. The main armament is derived from the Type 86 (W-86) 122 mm / 32 caliber towed howitzer, which itself is a Chinese licensed copy of the Soviet D-30 122 mm howitzer. PLZ-89 carries 40 rounds inside the turret. The gun is equipped with semi-automatic loader with maximum rate of fire of 6~8 rounds/min and fire accuracy is achieved by a digital fire-control system and a roof-mounted electro-optical sighting for day/night operations. This artillery system is compatible with Chinese and Russian 122 mm ammunition. Maximum range of fire is 18 km using standard HE projectile and 21 km with extended-range projectiles. Vehicle is fitted with a computerized fire control system, night vision.

Secondary armament consists of a roof-mounted QJC-88 12.7-mm machine gun. Armor of the Type 89 provides protection against small arms fire and artillery shell splinters. Vehicle is fitted with an NBC protection and automatic fire suppression systems. The Type 89 uses a tracked chassis, developed from the Type 77 amphibious armored personnel carrier. Vehicle is powered by the 12V150L12 diesel engine, developing 450 hp. The five crew members are protected by collective NBC protection system, fire detection, and automatic fire suppression system.  The Type 89 can be fitted with flotation kit for amphibious operation.

Variants
PLZ-89 Baseline military version.
SH-3 Export oriented variant featuring improved chassis, new engine, new transmission.

Operators

People's Liberation Army Ground Force - 500 PLZ-89

See also 
 List of equipment of the People's Liberation Army Ground Force
Related development
 Type 70 SPH - 122 mm self-propelled howitzer developed by China in 1960s.
 Type 85 SPH - 122 mm self-propelled howitzer developed by China in 1980s.
 PLZ-07 - successor of PLZ-89.
Comparable ground systems
 2S1 Gvozdika

References

Tracked self-propelled howitzers
Self-propelled artillery of the People's Republic of China
122 mm artillery
Military vehicles introduced in the 1990s